Proton-coupled amino acid transporter 2 is a protein which in humans is encoded by the SLC36A2 gene.

Function 

SLC36A2 transports small amino acids (glycine, alanine, and proline) and also the D-enantiomers and select amino acid derivatives, such as gamma-aminobutyric acid.

Clinical significance 

Mutations in the SLC36A2 gene are associated with Iminoglycinuria.

See also 

 Proton coupled amino acid transporter

References

Further reading

Solute carrier family